The 2010–11 season of Eintracht Braunschweig began on 13 June with a first training session. It is the club's third consecutive season in the 3. Liga after its first start in 2008. On 10 April 2011, with a victory over SpVgg Unterhaching, Eintracht secured the promotion to the 2. Bundesliga with six matches to play. With 85 points got Eintracht the championship of the 3. Liga, secured with a victory over VfB Stuttgart II on the 36th matchday. The team scored 81 goals the most, with 22 goals against the fewest in the league.

3. Liga

1st Half of Season Matches

2nd Half of Season matches

DFB-Pokal

1st round

Krombacher-Pokal

Round of 16

Quarter-final

Semi-final

Final

Friendlies

Players

Transfers 

In:

Out:

Management and coaching staff 

Since 12 May 2008 Torsten Lieberknecht is the manager of Eintracht Braunschweig.

References 

Eintracht Braunschweig
Eintracht Braunschweig seasons